The women's pole vault at the 2012 IAAF World Indoor Championships will be held at the Ataköy Athletics Arena on 11 March.

Medalists

Records

Qualification standards

Schedule

Results

Final

References

Official results

Pole Vault
Pole vault at the World Athletics Indoor Championships
2012 in women's athletics